These are the Lithuanian football standings from 1941–1950.

1941
 (Not Complete, World War II)
   
 1 Spartakas Kaunas            5  5  0  0  30-  3  27  10
 2 Spartakas Vilnius           4  3  0  1   8-  9  -1   6
 3 Dinamo Kaunas               2  2  0  0   5-  1   4   4
 4 Spartuolis Vilnius          4  2  0  2  11-  7   4   4
 5 Spartuolis Kaunas           4  2  0  2   9-  8   1   4
 6 Dinamo Vilnius              3  1  0  2   4- 12  -8   2
 7 Spartuolis Kaunas II        4  0  0  4   3- 10  -7   0
 8 Spartakas Siauliai          4  0  0  4   4- 24 -20   0
 
 Note: 1st USSR Invasion

1942

 Kaunas Group          
 
 1 LFLS Kaunas                 4  3  1  0  12-  3   9   7
 2 Tauras Kaunas               4  3  0  1  11-  7   4   6
 3 Perkunas Kaunas             4  2  0  2  11- 12  -1   4
 4 LGSF Kaunas                 4  1  1  2   9-  9   0   3
 5 Kovas Kaunas                4  0  0  4   9- 21 -12   0
 
 Promotion
   LFLS Vilnius - Sarunas Vilnius  2:2  3:1
 
 Siauliai Group
 
 1 Gubernija Siauliai          3  3  0  0  20-  3  17   6
 2 Zaibas Joniskis             3  2  0  1  10- 13  -3   4
 3 Zaibas Kursenai             3  1  0  2   4-  9  -5   2
 4 Batas Siauliai              3  0  0  3   1- 10  -9   0
 
 Panevezys Group
 
 1 MSK Panevezys               2  2  0  0  11-  1  10   4
 2 Vilkas Birzai               2  1  0  1   4-  8  -4   2
 3 Grandis Rokiskis            2  0  0  2   0-  6  -6   0
 
 Suduva Group
   Sveikata Kybartai - Suduva Marijampole  6:0  
 
 Ukmerge Group
   Perkunas Ukmerge
 
 Zemaitija Group
   Dziugas Telsiai - Babrungas Plungė  2:1
  
 1/4 Final 
   Gubernija Siauliai - Dziugas Telsiai  8:2
   MSK Panevezys - Perkunas Ukmerge  5:2
   LFLS Kaunas - Sveikata Kybartai  5:1 
 
 SemiFinal
   MSK Panevezys - Gubernija Siauliai  5:1
   LFLS Kaunas - LFLS Vilnius  3:1
 
 Final
 
   LFLS Kaunas - MSK Panevezys  2:0

1942/43

 Kaunas Group 
 
 1 Tauras Kaunas               8  5  2  1  24- 10  14  12
 2 Perkunas Kaunas             8  3  4  1  29- 18  11  10
 3 Kovas Kaunas                8  3  2  3  14- 21  -7   8
 4 LGSF Kaunas                 8  3  0  5  16- 24  -8   6
 5 LFLS Kaunas                 8  1  2  5  11- 21 -10   4
 
 Vilnius Group         
 
 1 LGSF Vilnius                4  4  0  0  12-  1  11   8
 2 LFLS Vilnius                4  1  0  3  11- 11   0   2
 3 Sarunas Vilnius             4  1  0  3   7- 18 -11   2
 
 Siauliai Group
 
 1 Gubernija Siauliai         11 10  0  1  46- 14  32  20
 2 Sakalas Siauliai           11  7  2  2  31- 18  13  16
 3 Wermachtfeld               11  5  3  3  22- 22   0  13
 4 Zaibas Kursenai            11  5  0  6  34- 23  11  10
 5 Zaibas Joniskis             7  4  1  2  24- 12  12   9
 6 Sarunas Siauliai           11  2  1  8  15- 31 -16   5
 7 Metalas Siauliai            6  0  1  5   3- 36 -33   1
 8 Tauras Taurage              6  0  0  6   6- 25 -19   0
 
 Panevezys Group
 
 1 MSK Panevezys               7  7  0  0  57-  2  55  14
 2 LGSF Panevezys              4  3  0  1   9-  8   1   6
 3 Grandis Rokiskis            7  2  0  5  12- 25 -13   4
 4 Vilkas Birzai               7  2  0  5   6- 22 -16   4
 5 Sakalas Obeliai             7  2  0  5  11- 38 -27   4
 
 Suduva Group
   Sveikata Kybartai - Dainava Alytus  3:0
 
 Jonava Group
   LFLS Jonava
 
 Zemaitija Group
   Dziugas Telsiai
 
 1/4 Final
   Gubernija Siauliai - Dziugas Telsiai  3:0
   LGSF Vilnius - LFLS Jonava  3:1  
   Tauras Kaunas - Sveikata Kybartai  5:0
 
 Semifinal
   MSK Panevezys - LGSF Vilnius  2:1
   Tauras Kaunas - Gubernija Siauliai  5:1
 
 Final
   
   Tauras Kaunas - MSK Panevezys  4:1

1943/44
 (Not Complete, 2nd USSR Invasion)
 
 1 Tauras Kaunas              14 10  2  2  41- 19  22  22
 2 Perkunas Kaunas            15 10  2  3  42- 16  26  22
 3 Gubernija Siauliai         15 10  2  3  46- 30  16  22
 4 LGSF Vilnius               14  7  0  7  30- 36  -6  14
 5 LGSF Kaunas                15  6  1  8  45- 33  12  13
 6 Kovas Kaunas               15  5  2  8  27- 43 -16  12
 7 MSK Panevezys              15  4  3  8  26- 43 -17  11
 8 Sarunas Vilnius            14  3  3  8  21- 41 -20   9
 9 LFLS Kaunas                15  2  3 10  22- 39 -17   7

 Between 1945 and 1989 the best teams:  
   Zalgiris (Spartakas) Vilnius
   Atlantas Klaipėda
   Inkaras Kaunas (some years)
 played in USSR Championships. 
 
 
 1945
 
 Kaunas Group
 
 1 Dinamo Kaunas               3  3  0  0  11-  2   9   6
 2 Spartakas Kaunas            3  2  0  1  24-  6  18   4
 3 Kovas Kaunas                3  1  0  2   6- 11  -5   2
 4 Zalgiris Kaunas             3  0  0  3   1- 23 -22   0
 
 Vilnius Group
 
 1 Dinamo Vilnius              2  2  0  0  12-  1  11   4
 2 Spartakas Vilnius           2  1  0  1   4-  3   1   2
 3 KN Vilnius                  2  0  0  2   1- 13 -12   0
 
 Siauliai Group
   Spartakas Siauliai - Zalgiris Siauliai  8:4
 
 Suduva Group
   Zalgiris Marijampole - Sveikata Kybartai  3:3  8:0
   
 
 1/4 Final
   Sodyba Klaipeda - Tauras Taurage  1:0
   Spartakas Kaunas - Zalgiris Marijampole  8:2
   Spartakas Siauliai - Dziugas Telsiai  12:1
   Dinamo Vilnius - MSK Panevezys  15:0
   
 SemiFinal
   Spartakas Kaunas - Sodyba Klaipeda  3:1
   Dinamo Vilnius - Spartakas Siauliai  6:0
 
 Final
 
   Spartakas Kaunas - Dinamo Vilnius  4:0

1946

 1 Dinamo Kaunas               7  6  1  0  32- 11  21  13
 2 Spartakas Kaunas            7  5  0  2  27- 11  16  10
 3 Lokomotyvas Panevezys       7  3  3  1  12- 14  -2   9
 4 Spartakas Siauliai          7  4  0  3  33- 28   5   8
 5 Lokomotyvas Kaunas          7  3  1  3  20- 15   5   7
 6 Žalgiris Vilnius            7  1  2  4   9- 21 -12   4
 7 Audra Klaipeda              7  2  0  5  12- 30 -18   4
 8 Dinamo Vilnius              7  0  1  6  15- 30 -15   1
 
 Promotion
   Veliava Siauliai
   Zalgiris Marijampole

1947

  1 Lokomotyvas Kaunas        17 14  0  3  51- 23  28  28
  2 Spartakas Siauliai        17 11  1  5  58- 30  28  23
  3 Zalgiris Klaipeda         17 10  3  4  33- 29   4  23
  4 Spartakas Kaunas          17 10  2  5  55- 39  16  22
  5 Dinamo Kaunas             17  7  3  7  43- 31  12  17
  6 Veliava Siauliai          17  7  1  9  51- 43   8  15
  7 Zalgiris Marijampole      17  6  3  8  33- 38  -5  15
  8 Zalgiris Panevezys        17  7  1  9  21- 33 -12  15
  9 Dinamo Vilnius            17  2  0 15  11- 49 -38   4
 10 Zalgiris Vilnius           9  0  0  9   3- 44 -41   0
 
 Promotion
   Zalgiris Siauliai
   Zalgiris Kaunas
 
 
 CUP
 
 SemiFinal
   Lokomotyvas Kaunas - Zalgiris Ukmerge  6:2
   Veliava Siauliai - Audra Klaipeda  3:2
   
 Final
   Lokomotyvas Kaunas - Veliava Siauliai  3:2

1948

 North
   
  1 Audra Klaipeda             8  6  0  2  28- 13  15  12
  2 Zalgiris Siauliai          8  5  1  2  17- 13   4  11
  3 Zalgiris Taurage           8  5  0  3  28- 17  11  10
  4 ASK Kaunas                 8  4  1  3  22- 21   1   9
  5 Veliava Siauliai           8  4  0  4  24- 11  13   8
  6 Spartakas Plunge           8  3  1  4  18- 26  -8   7
  7 Zalgiris Panevezys         8  3  1  4   9- 15  -6   7
  8 Spartakas Siauliai         8  3  0  5  16- 24  -8   6
  9 GSK Klaipeda               8  1  0  7  15- 37 -22   2
 
 South
 
  1 Spartakas Vilnius          9  7  0  2  28- 14  14  14
  2 Elnias Siauliai            9  6  1  2  28- 13  15  13
  3 Dinamo Vilnius             9  5  1  3  22- 13   9  11
  4 Kauno audiniai             9  5  1  3  24- 15   9  11
  5 Spartakas Kaunas           9  3  3  3  15- 18  -3   9
  6 Inkaras Kaunas             9  4  1  4  16- 22  -6   9
  7 KKI Kaunas                 9  4  1  4  10- 16  -6   9
  8 Lokomotyvas Kaunas         9  1  3  5  11- 22 -11   5
  9 Zalgiris Ukmerge           9  1  3  5  11- 25 -14   5
 10 Zalgiris Marijampole       9  1  2  6  15- 22  -7   4
   
 Final
   
  1 Elnias Siauliai            5  4  0  1  22- 11  11   8
  2 Zalgiris Taurage           5  3  1  1  14- 10   4   7
  3 Spartakas Vilnius          5  2  1  2  15- 11   4   5
  4 Dinamo Vilnius             5  1  3  1  10- 10   0   5
  5 Audra Klaipeda             5  1  1  3   5-  7  -2   3
  6 Zalgiris Siauliai          5  0  2  3   7- 24 -17   2
  
  7 Inkaras Kaunas             5  5  0  0  21- 11  10  10
  8 Kauno audiniai             5  4  0  1   9-  3   6   8
  9 Spartakas Plunge           5  3  0  2  10-  8   2   6
 10 Spartakas Kaunas           5  2  0  3   3-  9  -6   4
 11 Veliava Siauliai           5  1  0  4   7- 13  -6   2
 12 ASK Kaunas                 5  0  0  5   5- 11  -6   0
 
 13 Lokomotyvas Kaunas         6  5  0  1  11-  1  10  10
 14 Zalgiris Ukmerge           6  5  0  1   8-  9  -1  10
 15 Spartakas Siauliai         6  3  1  2   0-  0   0   7
 16 Zalgiris Marijampole       6  3  1  2   2-  5  -3   7
 17 GSK Klaipeda               6  2  0  4   3-  9  -6   4
 18 KKI Kaunas                 6  1  0  5   0-  0   0   2
 19 Zalgiris Panevezys         6  1  0  5   0-  0   0   2
   
   
 Promotion
   Sveikata Kybartai
   Dinamo Utena
   Spartakas Joniskis
   
 
 CUP
 
 SemiFinal
   Inkaras Kaunas - Elnias Siauliai  4:0
   Lokomotyvas Kaunas - ASK Kaunas  2:1 
  
 Final
   Inkaras Kaunas - Lokomotyvas Kaunas  4:0

1949

  1 Elnias Siauliai           14 12  0  2  59- 19  40  24
  2 Inkaras Kaunas            14 12  0  2  78-  9  69  24
  3 Veliava Siauliai          14 11  1  2  40- 24  16  23
  4 Kauno audiniai            14 10  1  3  53- 28  25  21
  5 Audra Klaipeda            14 10  1  3  40- 15  25  21
  6 ASK Kaunas                14  7  0  7  43- 36   7  14
  7 Zalgiris Marijampole      14  6  1  7  16- 23  -7  13
  8 Spartakas Plunge          14  6  1  7  22- 45 -23  13
  9 Spartakas Vilnius         14  5  2  7  30- 37  -7  12
 10 Dinamo Vilnius            14  6  0  8  26- 39 -13  12
 11 Zalgiris Kybartai         14  6  0  8  27- 41 -14  12
 12 Spartakas Kaunas          14  3  2  9  18- 36 -18   8
 13 Zalgiris Taurage          14  3  0 11  28- 67 -39   6
 14 Zalgiris Ukmerge          14  2  1 11  14- 45 -31   5
 15 Zalgiris Panevezys        14  1  0 13  17- 47 -30   2
  
 Final
  
   Elnias Siauliai - Inkaras Kaunas  1:0
  
 Promotion
   FSK Kaunas
  
  
 CUP
 
 SemiFinal
   Inkaras Kaunas - Elnias Siauliai  5:2
   Kauno audiniai - FSK Kaunas  4:3
 
 Final
   Inkaras Kaunas - Kauno audiniai  1:0

1950

 Group I
   
  1 Zalgiris Kybartai          7  6  1  0  36- 12  24  13
  2 Elnias Siauliai            7  6  0  1  29-  5  24  12
  3 Kauno audiniai             7  4  0  3  26- 18   8   8
  4 Zalgiris Panevezys         7  3  2  2  15- 16  -1   8
  5 Spartakas Vilnius          7  3  0  4  16- 16   0   6
  6 Zalgiris Ukmerge           7  2  1  4  10- 27 -17   5
  7 Cukraus fab. Marijampole   7  1  2  4  13- 16  -3   4
  8 Zalgiris Taurage           7  0  0  7   8- 43 -35   0
 
 Group II
   
  1 Inkaras Kaunas             7  7  0  0  35-  3  32  14
  2 FSK Kaunas                 7  4  1  2  11- 12  -1   9
  3 Audra Klaipeda             7  4  0  3  21- 13   8   8
  4 Dinamo Utena               7  4  0  3  16- 12   4   8
  5 Dinamo Vilnius             7  2  2  3  13- 18  -5   6
  6 ASK Kaunas                 7  2  0  5  12- 17  -5   4
  7 Spartakas Plunge           7  1  2  4  12- 20  -8   4
  8 Spartakas Kaunas           7  1  1  5   4- 29 -25   3
  
 Final
  
  1 Inkaras Kaunas            14 13  0  1  61- 10  51  26
  2 Elnias Siauliai           14 12  0  2  58- 10  48  24
  3 Audra Klaipeda            14  7  0  7  24- 41 -17  14
  4 FSK Kaunas                14  5  2  7  37- 48 -11  12
  5 Zalgiris Kybartai         14  6  0  8  21- 48 -27  12
  6 Dinamo Utena              14  5  0  9  28- 28   0  10
  7 Kauno audiniai            14  4  2  8  30- 40 -10  10
  8 Zalgiris Panevezys        14  1  2 11  21- 55 -34   4
 
  9 Dinamo Vilnius             7  7  0  0  21-  3  18  14
 10 ASK Kaunas                 7  3  3  1  22- 11  11   9
 11 Zalgiris Ukmerge           7  4  1  2  15- 12   3   9
 12 Spartakas Vilnius          7  4  1  2   7- 11  -4   9
 13 Cukraus fab. Marijam       7  3  1  3   9-  9   0   7
 14 Spartakas Plunge           7  1  1  5   9- 17  -8   3
 15 Spartakas Kaunas           7  1  1  5   5- 15 -10   3
 16 Zalgiris Taurage           7  1  0  6   2- 12 -10   2
 
 Promotion
   Saliutas Vilnius
   Lituanika Kaunas
 
 
 CUP
   
 SemiFinal
   Inkaras Kaunas - Dinamo Utena  2:0
   Elnias Siauliai - Spartakas Plunge  3:0
   
 Final
   Elnias Siauliai - Inkaras Kaunas  4:0

Sources
RSSF/Almantas Lahzadis

Football in Lithuania